Abas Arslanagić (born October 2, 1944) is a Bosnian former handball player and coach who competed for Yugoslavia in the 1972 Summer Olympics and in the 1976 Summer Olympics.

In 1972, he was part of the Yugoslav team which won the gold medal at the Munich Games. He played five matches including the final as goalkeeper.

Four years later, he was a member of the Yugoslav team which finished fifth in the Olympic tournament. He played all six matches as goalkeeper.

In 2013, Arslanagić went into retirement from coaching.

Honours
Player
Borac Banja Luka
Yugoslav First League: 1972-73, 1973–74, 1974–75, 1975–76
Yugoslav Cup: 1969, 1972, 1973, 1974, 1975
European Champions Cup: 1975-76

Yugoslavia
1970 World Championship third place
1972 Summer Olympics first place
1974 World Championship third place
1975 Mediterranean Games first place
1976 Summer Olympics fifth place

Coach
Metaloplastika
Yugoslav First League: 1987-88

Qatar
1989 Asian Championship sixth place
1991 Asian Championship fourth place
1993 Asian Championship seventh place

Benfica
Portuguese First Division: 1988-89, 1989-1990
Portuguese Super Cup: 1989

Zagreb
Croatian First A League: 1995-96
Croatian Cup: 1996

Celje
Slovenian First League: 1998-99, 1999-00
Slovenian Cup: 1999, 2000

Bosna Sarajevo
First League of Bosnia and Herzegovina: 2002-03
Handball Cup of Bosnia and Herzegovina: 2003

References

databaseolympics.com profile

1944 births
Living people
Yugoslav male handball players
Olympic handball players of Yugoslavia
Handball players at the 1972 Summer Olympics
Handball players at the 1976 Summer Olympics
Olympic gold medalists for Yugoslavia
People from Derventa
Olympic medalists in handball
Medalists at the 1972 Summer Olympics
Mediterranean Games gold medalists for Yugoslavia
Competitors at the 1975 Mediterranean Games
RK Medveščak Zagreb
Mediterranean Games medalists in handball
Bosnia and Herzegovina handball coaches
Handball coaches of international teams